The 1986–87 Quebec Nordiques season was the Nordiques eighth season in the National Hockey League. An aspect of the Quebec Nordiques season was that it hosted Rendez-vous '87, a series of two matches consisting of NHL All-Stars versus Soviet All-Stars.

Offseason
Quebec had a very quiet off-season, as the only notable player movement was Alain Lemieux leaving the club as a free agent, as he signed a contract with the Pittsburgh Penguins.  Lemieux only appeared in seven regular season games with the Nordiques, getting no points, however, Lemieux did play in a playoff game, earning a goal and three points.  He finished second in scoring on the Fredericton Express, earning 74 points.

Regular season
Quebec started the season off hot, going 6-2-2 in their first ten games, however, a 7-11-2 record over their next twenty games saw the Nordiques fall to 13-13-4.  The club continued to struggle, going 6-13-3, to fall to 19-26-7, and battling the Buffalo Sabres for the final playoff spot in the Adams Division.  Quebec would finish the season with a 31-39-10 record, earning 72 points, which was the team's worst point total since their first season in 1979–80.  The Nordiques finished in fourth place, and earned a playoff spot for the seventh straight season.

Offensively, Michel Goulet led the way, scoring 49 goals and 96 points to lead the Nordiques.  Peter Stastny had an injury plagued season, missing 18 games, however, he still scored 24 goals and 77 points to finish in second in team scoring.  Anton Stastny and Brent Ashton each cleared the 20 goal plateau, as they had 27 and 25 respectively.

On the blueline, Risto Siltanen had 10 goals and 39 points to lead the defense, while Jeff Brown had seven goals and 29 points in only 44 games played with Quebec.

In goal, Clint Malarchuk played the majority of the games, as his 18 wins were a team high.  Mario Gosselin had 13 wins, and posted a team best 3.18 GAA in 30 games.

Rendez-vous '87
Rendez-vous '87 was an ice hockey exhibition series between the Soviet men's national ice hockey team and a team of All-Stars from the National Hockey League, held in Quebec City. It replaced the NHL's All-Star festivities for the 1986–87 NHL season. The Soviet team was paid $80,000 for their appearance in Rendez-vous '87, while the NHLers raised $350,000 for the players' pension fund.

Rendez-vous '87 was designed as a follow-up to the Challenge Cup series in 1979, hoping that the team of NHL All-Stars could beat the Soviet team, unlike before. To this end, the series was a two-game affair instead of a three-game affair in 1979. The two-game series took place during five days of festivities starting on February 9, 1987, and finishing on February 13. The series was very successful, with some, including Wayne Gretzky, calling for more international hockey, especially between Canada and the Soviet Union, the two top powers of hockey at the time.

Final standings

Schedule and results

Player statistics

Playoffs
Quebec opened the 1987 Stanley Cup playoffs with a first round matchup against the Hartford Whalers in a best of seven series.  The Whalers, who swept the Nordiques in 1986, finished the season in first place in the Adams Division with a 43-30-7 record, earning 93 points, which was 21 more than Quebec.  The series began with two games at the Hartford Civic Center, and the Whalers continued their winning ways against the Nordiques in the playoffs, winning the first game 3–2 in overtime, followed by a narrow 5–4 victory over Quebec in the second game to take a 2–0 series lead.  With the series moving to Le Colisée for the next two games, the Nordiques responded, easily defeating Hartford 5–1 in the third game, followed by a 4–1 win in the fourth game to even the series at two.  The series shifted back to Hartford for the fifth game, however, the Nordiques came out ahead with a solid 7–5 victory, to take a 3–2 series lead.  Quebec would complete the upset, winning 5–4 in overtime in the sixth game in Quebec City, to win the series 4–2.

The Nordiques then moved on to face the Montreal Canadiens, the defending Stanley Cup champions, in the Battle of Quebec in the best of seven Adams Division final.  Montreal had a 41-29-10 record, getting 92 points, which was 20 more than the Nordiques.  Montreal swept the Boston Bruins in four games in the first round of the playoffs.  The series opened with two games at the Montreal Forum, but it was the Nordiques, who stayed hot, took a 2–0 series lead, defeating the Canadiens 7–5 in the series opener, followed by a 2–1 win in the second game.  The series moved to Le Colisée for the next two games, and the Canadiens rebounded, easily defeating the Nordiques 7–2 in the third game, then tied the series with a 3–2 overtime win in the fourth game.  In the fifth game back in Montreal, the Canadiens held off the Nordiques once again, winning 3–2 to take the series lead after a goal by Alain Cote was waived off early in the third period. Quebec then tied the series up in the sixth game, hanging on with a 3–2 win, to force a seventh and deciding game.  In the seventh game, the Canadiens proved to be too strong for Quebec, defeating the Nordiques 5–3 to win the series. This would be the Nordiques last playoff appearance until 1993.

Quebec Nordiques 4, Hartford Whalers 2

Montreal Canadiens 4, Quebec Nordiques 3

Transactions
The Nordiques made the following transactions during the 1986–87 season.

Trades

Free agents

Draft picks
Quebec's draft picks from the 1986 NHL Entry Draft which was held at the Montreal Forum in Montreal, Quebec.

Awards and records
 Michel Goulet, left wing, NHL First Team All-Star

References
 Nordiques on Hockey Database

Quebec Nordiques season, 1986-87
Quebec Nordiques seasons
Que